My Learned Friend is a 1943 British, black-and-white, comedy, farce, directed by Basil Dearden with his regular collaborator, Will Hay, as the film's star in the role of William Fitch. The principal supporting roles were taken by Claude Hulbert and Mervyn Johns .  Character roles went to Laurence Hanray as Sir Norman, Charles Victor as "Safety" Wilson, Ernest Thesiger as Ferris and Ronald Shiner as the Man in Wilson's café. It was produced by Michael Balcon, Robert Hamer and Ealing Studios.

The film's title refers to a tradition in British law: when addressing either the court or the judge, a barrister refers to the opposing counsel using the respectful term, "my learned friend".

This was Will Hay's last film; Hay went on to star as "Doctor Muffin" in The Will Hay Programme that aired on the radio in 1944. The humour of My Learned Friend took a darker turn than any of Hay's earlier films.

Plot
This comedy sees Will Hay playing a seedy lawyer, who finds himself marked for assassination by a forger whom he previously defended unsuccessfully. He teams up with an incompetent solicitor to try to prevent the deaths of others involved.

The film climaxes with a sequence where Hay hangs from the hands of the clock face of Big Ben in an attempt to prevent a time bomb being detonated.

References

External links
 
 
 

1943 films
1940s crime comedy films
British black-and-white films
British crime comedy films
Films directed by Will Hay
Films directed by Basil Dearden
Films produced by Michael Balcon
Ealing Studios films
Films set in London
Films set in Lancashire
1943 comedy films
1940s English-language films
1940s British films